Apoica is a genus of eusocial paper wasps found throughout the Central and South American tropics.  These wasps are truly nocturnal, carrying out their foraging activities after the setting of the sun.  They prefer to construct their nests, which have an open comb like many paper wasps, under large leaves, or in shrubs.  During the day, wasps covering the comb fan their wings to cool the nest, keeping it at a suitable temperature for larval development.

When attacking prey, Apoica release a drop of venom from their stings, which in turn attracts any nearby wasps to attack.

Species 
Apoica albimacula (Fabricius)
Apoica ambracarina Pickett
Apoica arborea Saussure
Apoica flavissima Van der Vecht
Apoica gelida Van der Vecht
Apoica pallens (Fabricius)
Apoica pallida (Olivier)
Apoica strigata Richards
Apoica thoracica Buysson
Apoica traili (Cameron)
Apoica ujhelyii (Ducke)

References

Pickett, K. M. and J. W. Wenzel. 2007. Revision and cladistic analysis of the nocturnal social wasp genus, Apoica Lepeletier (Hymenoptera: Vespidae; Polistinae, Epiponini). American Museum Novitates, Number 3562, 30 pp.

Vespidae
Hymenoptera genera